Abazu is a village in the Bago Region of south-east Myanmar.

See also
List of cities, towns and villages in Myanmar: A

References

External links
MSN Encarta map
Satellite map at Maplandia.com

Populated places in Bago Region